Futsal at the 2007 Asian Indoor Games was held in Macau, China from 26 October to 3 November 2007.

Medalists

Medal table

Results

Men

Preliminary

Group A

Group B

Group C

Group D 

 Kuwait was disqualified from the tournament on 29 October after Kuwait Football Association was suspended by FIFA.

Knockout round

Quarterfinals

Semifinals

Bronze medal match

Gold medal match

Goalscorers

Women

Preliminary

Group A

Group B

Placing

Knockout round

Semifinals

Bronze medal match

Gold medal match

Goalscorers

References

 RSSSF

2007 Asian Indoor Games events
Indoor Games
2007
2007
Futsal in Macau